David McGowan (born 23 February 1986) is a former rugby union player. He is originally from Sligo in the province of Connacht, Ireland.

Further Education 

He is also planning for his future after Rugby by studying for a Manufacturing Management Degree  through an on-line course via Institute of Technology, Sligo. He is scheduled to graduate in November 2010. He also studied civil engineering in Athlone Institute of Technology to ordinary degree level.

Rugby 

His position is lock. He has represented Ireland at Under 19  & Under 21  levels. He first played for Irish club Sligo RFC and later Buccaneers RFC and he went on to represent his native province Connacht Rugby initially as a member of the Academy.

With playing opportunities limited at Connacht David left for France in the summer of 2007, where he joined and currently plays for La Rochelle initially in the French Rugby Pro D2 league.

Top 14 
At the end of season 2009-2010 La Rochelle qualified for a play-off final to qualify for the Top 14, with a 32–26 victory against Lyon OU in the ProD2 play-off final at Brive's Stade Amédée Domenech  and achieve promotion to the top level of French Rugby for season 2010–2011.

References 

Irish rugby union players
Alumni of Athlone Institute of Technology
Living people
Buccaneers RFC players
Connacht Rugby players
Stade Rochelais players
1986 births
Rugby union locks
Rugby union players from County Sligo